The Sultanate of Zanzibar, also known as the Zanzibar Sultanate, was a Muslim state controlled by the Sultan of Zanzibar, in place between 1856 and 1964. The Sultanate's territories varied over time, and after a period of decline, the state had sovereignty over only the Zanzibar Archipelago and a  strip along the Kenyan coast, with the interior of Kenya constituting the British Kenya Colony and the coastal strip administered as a de facto part of that colony.

Under an agreement reached on 8 October 1963, the Sultan of Zanzibar relinquished sovereignty over his remaining territory on the mainland, and on 12 December 1963, Kenya officially obtained independence from the British. On 12 January 1964, Jamshid bin Abdullah, the last sultan, was deposed and lost sovereignty over the last of his dominions, Zanzibar, marking the end of the Sultanate.

History

Founding 

In 1698, Zanzibar became part of the overseas holdings of Oman after Saif bin Sultan, the Imam of Oman, defeated the Portuguese in Mombasa, in what is now Kenya. In 1832 or 1840, Omani ruler Said bin Sultan moved his court from Muscat to Stone Town on the island of Unguja (that is, Zanzibar Island). He established a ruling Arab elite and encouraged the development of clove plantations, using the island's slave labour. Zanzibar's commerce fell increasingly into the hands of traders from the Indian subcontinent, whom Said encouraged to settle on the island. After his death in 1856, two of his sons, Majid bin Said and Thuwaini bin Said, struggled over the succession, so Zanzibar and Oman were divided into two separate realms. Thuwaini became the Sultan of Muscat and Oman while Majid became the first Sultan of Zanzibar, but obliged to pay an annual tribute to the Omani court in Muscat. During his 14-year reign as Sultan, Majid consolidated his power around the local slave trade. His successor, Barghash bin Said, helped abolish the slave trade in Zanzibar and largely developed the country's infrastructure. The third Sultan, Khalifa bin Said, also furthered the country's progress toward abolishing slavery.

According to the 16th-century explorer Leo Africanus, Zanzibar (Zanguebar) was the term used by Arabs and Persians to refer to the eastern African coast running from Kenya to Mozambique, dominated by five semi-independent Muslim kingdoms: Mombasa, Malindi, Kilwa, Mozambique, and Sofala. Africanus further noted that they all had standing agreements of loyalty with the major central African states, including the Kingdom of Mutapa.

Context for the Sultan's loss of control over his dominions

Until 1884, the Sultans of Zanzibar controlled a substantial portion of the Swahili Coast, known as Zanj, and trading routes extending further into the continent, as far as Kindu on the Congo River. That year, however, the Society for German Colonization forced local chiefs on the mainland to agree to German protection, prompting Sultan Bargash bin Said to protest. Coinciding with the Berlin Conference and the Scramble for Africa, further German interest in the area was soon shown in 1885 by the arrival of the newly created German East Africa Company, which had a mission to colonize the area.

In 1886, the British and Germans secretly met and discussed their aims of expansion in the African Great Lakes, with spheres of influence already agreed upon the year before, with the British to take what would become the East Africa Protectorate (now Kenya) and the Germans to take present-day Tanzania. Both powers leased coastal territory from Zanzibar and established trading stations and outposts. Over the next few years, all of the mainland possessions of Zanzibar came to be administered by European imperial powers, beginning in 1888 when the Imperial British East Africa Company took over administration of Mombasa.

The same year the German East Africa Company acquired formal direct rule over the coastal area previously submitted to German protection. This resulted in a native uprising, the Abushiri revolt, which was suppressed by the Kaiserliche Marine and heralded the end of Zanzibar's influence on the mainland.

Establishment of the Zanzibar Protectorate

With the signing of the Heligoland-Zanzibar Treaty between the United Kingdom and the German Empire in 1890, Zanzibar itself became a British protectorate. In August 1896, following the death of Sultan Hamad bin Thuwaini, Britain and Zanzibar fought a 38-minute war, the shortest in recorded history. A struggle for succession took place as the Sultan's cousin Khalid bin Barghash seized power. The British instead wanted Hamoud bin Mohammed to become Sultan, believing that he would be much easier to work with. The British gave Khalid an hour to vacate the Sultan's palace in Stone Town. Khalid failed to do so, and instead assembled an army of 2,800 men to fight the British. The British launched an attack on the palace and other locations around the city after which Khalid retreated and later went into exile. Hamoud was then peacefully installed as Sultan.

That "Zanzibar" for these purposes included the  coastal strip of Kenya that would later become the Protectorate of Kenya was a matter recorded in the parliamentary debates at the time.

Establishment of the East Africa Protectorate

In 1886, the British government encouraged William Mackinnon, who already had an agreement with the Sultan and whose shipping company traded extensively in the African Great Lakes, to increase British influence in the region. He formed a British East Africa Association which led to the Imperial British East Africa Company being chartered in 1888 and given the original grant to administer the territory. The British "sphere of influence", agreed at the Berlin Conference of 1885, extended up the coast and inland across the future Kenya and after 1890 included Uganda as well. Mombasa was the administrative centre at this time.

However, the company began to fail, and on 1 July 1895 the British government proclaimed a protectorate, the East Africa Protectorate, the administration being transferred to the Foreign Office. In 1902, administration was again transferred to the Colonial Office and the Uganda territory was incorporated as part of the protectorate also. In 1897 Lord Delamere, the pioneer of white settlement, arrived in the Kenya highlands, which was then part of the Protectorate. Lord Delamere was impressed by the agricultural possibilities of the area. In 1902 the boundaries of the Protectorate were extended to include what was previously the Eastern Province of Uganda. Lord Delamere now commenced extensive farming operations, and in 1905, when a large number of immigrants arrived from Britain and South Africa, the Protectorate was transferred from the authority of the Foreign Office to that of the Colonial Office. The capital was shifted from Mombasa to Nairobi in 1905. A regular Government and Legislature were constituted by Order in Council in 1906. This constituted the administrator a governor and provided for legislative and executive councils. Lieutenant Colonel J. Hayes Sadler was the first governor and commander in chief. There were occasional troubles with local tribes but the country was opened up by the colonial government with little bloodshed. After the First World War, more immigrants arrived from Britain and South Africa, and by 1919 the European population was estimated at 9,000 strong.

Loss of sovereignty over Kenya

On 23 July 1920, the inland areas of the East Africa Protectorate were annexed as British dominions by Order in Council. That part of the former Protectorate was thereby constituted as the Colony of Kenya and from that time, the Sultan of Zanzibar ceased to be sovereign over that territory. That coastal strip, remaining under the sovereignty of the Sultan of Zanzibar, was constituted as the Protectorate of Kenya in 1920.

The Protectorate of Kenya was governed as part of the Colony of Kenya by virtue of an agreement between the United Kingdom and the Sultan dated 14 December 1895. In summary, the "Colony of Kenya" referred to the interior lands. The "Protectorate of Kenya" was a  coastal strip together with certain islands which remained under the sovereignty of the Sultan of Zanzibar until the independence of Kenya.

The Colony of Kenya and the Protectorate of Kenya each came to an end on 12 December 1963. The United Kingdom ceded sovereignty over the Colony of Kenya and, under an agreement dated 8 October 1963, the Sultan agreed that simultaneously with independence for Kenya, the Sultan would cease to have sovereignty over the Protectorate of Kenya. In this way, Kenya became an independent country under the Kenya Independence Act 1963. Exactly 12 months later on 12 December 1964, Kenya became a republic under the name "Republic of Kenya".

End of the Zanzibar Protectorate and deposition of the Sultan 

On 10 December 1963, the Protectorate that had existed over Zanzibar since 1890 was terminated by the United Kingdom. The United Kingdom did not grant Zanzibar independence, as such, because the UK never had sovereignty over Zanzibar. Rather, by the Zanzibar Act 1963 of the United Kingdom, the UK ended the Protectorate and made provision for full-self government in Zanzibar as an independent country within the Commonwealth. Upon the Protectorate being abolished, Zanzibar became a constitutional monarchy within the Commonwealth under the Sultan. Sultan Jamshid bin Abdullah was overthrown a month later during the Zanzibar Revolution. Jamshid fled into exile, and the Sultanate was replaced by the People's Republic of Zanzibar. In April 1964, the existence of this socialist republic was ended with its union with Tanganyika to form the United Republic of Tanganyika and Zanzibar, which became known as Tanzania six months later.

Demographics

By 1964, the country was a constitutional monarchy within the Commonwealth ruled by Sultan Jamshid bin Abdullah. Zanzibar had a population of around 230,000 natives, some of whom claimed Persian ancestry and were known locally as Shirazis. It also contained significant minorities in the 50,000 Arabs and 20,000 South Asians who were prominent in business and trade.  The various ethnic groups were becoming mixed and the distinctions between them had blurred; according to one historian, an important reason for the general support for Sultan Jamshid was his family's ethnic diversity. However, the island's Arab inhabitants, as the major landowners, were generally wealthier than the natives; the major political parties were organised largely along ethnic lines, with Arabs dominating the Zanzibar Nationalist Party (ZNP) and natives the Afro-Shirazi Party (ASP).

See also

 List of sultans of Zanzibar

References

Bibliography

 
 
 
 
.
.
.

External links
 The Official Website of the Zanzibar Royal Family
 

 
Former Commonwealth monarchies
Zanzibar
Island countries of the Indian Ocean
1856 establishments in Africa
1964 disestablishments in Africa
Zanzibar, Sultanate of
Zanzibar, Sultanate of
States and territories established in 1856
States and territories disestablished in 1964
Tanzania and the Commonwealth of Nations
Former countries
Arab slave owners